James Bennett Stewart (born c. 1952) is an American lawyer, journalist, and author.

Early life and education
Stewart was born in Quincy, Illinois. He graduated from DePauw University and Harvard Law School.

Career
He is a member of the Bar of New York, the Bloomberg Professor of Business and Economic Journalism at the Columbia University Graduate School of Journalism, Editor-at-Large of SmartMoney magazine, and author of Tangled Webs: How False Statements are Undermining America: From Martha Stewart to Bernie Madoff (2011). He is a former associate at New York law firm Cravath, Swaine & Moore, which he left in 1979 to become executive editor of The American Lawyer magazine. He later joined The Wall Street Journal, where earned the 1987 Gerald Loeb Award for Deadline and/or Beat Writing. He shared the 1988 Pulitzer Prize for Explanatory Journalism and the Gerald Loeb Award for Large Newspapers for his articles about the 1987 dramatic upheaval in the stock market and insider trading. These writings led to the publishing of his best-selling work of non-fiction called Den of Thieves (1991), which recounted the criminal conduct of Wall Street arbitrager Ivan Boesky and junk bond king Michael Milken. Stewart became page one editor of The Wall Street Journal in 1988 and remained at the paper until 1992, when he left to help found SmartMoney.

Stewart's book Blind Eye: The Terrifying Story Of A Doctor Who Got Away With Murder (1999), won the 2000 Edgar Award in the Best Fact Crime category. DisneyWar (2005), his book on Michael Eisner's reign at Disney, won the Gerald Loeb Award for Best Business Book. In 2007, he was ranked 21st on Out magazine's 50 Most Powerful Gay Men and Women in America. He is currently a contributor to The New Yorker and a columnist for The New York Times, which he joined in 2011. Stewart also serves on the board of advisory trustees  of his alma mater, DePauw University, and is past president of that board.

Notable stories

Jeffrey Epstein 
On August 12, 2019, Stewart reported on a conversation he had with convicted sex offender Jeffrey Epstein. Epstein reportedly told Stewart that he was advising Elon Musk and Tesla. Stewart was also told by Epstein that he had dirt on powerful people including personal details about their sexual activities and drug use.

On July 31, 2019, Stewart along with Matthew Goldstein and Jessica Silver-Greenberg reported about Epstein's interest in Eugenics and how he wished to seed the human race by using his own DNA. He also reportedly wanted his head and penis frozen.

In October 2019, Stewart and Emily Flitter partnered on a piece which provided more detail as to Epstein's relationship with Microsoft founder Bill Gates, which had started after Epstein had become a registered sex offender.

Bibliography

Books

 
 
 
 
 
 
 ; a biography of Rick Rescorla, Morgan Stanley security director who died at WTC
 
 
 
  (with Rachel Abrams)

Essays and reporting

Awards 
Stewart was inducted as a Laureate of The Lincoln Academy of Illinois and awarded the Order of Lincoln (the State's highest honor) by the Governor of Illinois in 2002 in the area of Communications.

In 1996 Stewart received an honorary doctorate from Quincy University.

Stewart has earned five Gerald Loeb Awards: the 1987 Deadline and/or Beat Writing award for "Coverage of Wall Street Insider Trading Scandal", the 1988 Large Newspapers award for "Terrible Tuesday", the 2006 Business Book award for "DisneyWar", the 2016 Commentary award for "Inside the Boardroom", and the 2019 Feature award for "'If Bobbie Talks, I'm Finished': How Les Moonves Tried to Silence an Accuser".

See also
Deep state in the United States

References

External links
 
Common Sense column archive at The Wall Street Journal
Contributor Profile 2011 at The New Yorker

Profile at Royce Carlton
'Deep State' Author Says Trump Has Learned Nothing From The Russia Investigation October 7, 2019 NPR
How ‘Deep State’ book disputes accusations of Trump bias at FBI, DOJ October 10, 2019 PBS NewsHour

1952 births
American crime writers
American male journalists
DePauw University alumni
Edgar Award winners
American gay writers
Harvard Law School alumni
Living people
People from Quincy, Illinois
Pulitzer Prize for Explanatory Journalism winners
Writers from Illinois
Gerald Loeb Award winners for Large Newspapers
Gerald Loeb Award winners for Business Books
Gerald Loeb Award winners for Columns, Commentary, and Editorials
Gerald Loeb Award winners for Deadline and Beat Reporting
Gerald Loeb Award winners for Feature
Journalists from Illinois
The New Yorker staff writers
Educators from Illinois